Said Hamulic (born 12 November 2000) is a professional footballer who plays as a forward for Ligue 1 club Toulouse.

Career

Before the 2021 season, Hamulic signed for Lithuanian side Dainava after being approached by Welsh club Airbus UK Broughton and trialing for teams such as Championship club Huddersfield and Braga in the Portuguese top flight.

Before the second half of the 2021–22 season, he moved on loan to Botev II in Bulgaria. In early 2022, he left on loan again, this time joining Lithuanian club Sūduva.

On 12 July 2022, Hamulic joined Stal Mielec in the Polish top flight, on loan with a buy option. Four days later, he made his Ekstraklasa debut, coming on as a substitute in a 0–2 away win against Lech Poznań.

On 24 January 2023, he signed for Ligue 1 club Toulouse after Stal exercised their buy option.

International career
Hamulic is eligible to represent both Netherlands and Bosnia and Herzegovina internationally. In January 2023, he announced his intention to represent Bosnia and Herzegovina internationally.

Personal life
Hamulic was born in Leiderdorp, Netherlands to a Bosnian family. His father hails from Cazin and his mother from Bosanska Krupa. He holds both Dutch and Bosnian citizenship.

Honours
Individual
A Lyga Team of the Year: 2021
A Lyga Young Player of the Month: July 2021, October 2021, May 2022
Ekstraklasa Player of the Month: October 2022

References

External links
 

2000 births
Living people
People from Leiderdorp
Dutch people of Bosnia and Herzegovina descent
Association football forwards
Dutch footballers
FK Dainava Alytus players
Botev Plovdiv players
FK Sūduva Marijampolė players
Stal Mielec players
Toulouse FC players
A Lyga players
Second Professional Football League (Bulgaria) players
Ekstraklasa players
Ligue 1 players
Championnat National 3 players
Dutch expatriate footballers
Expatriate footballers in Bulgaria
Expatriate footballers in Lithuania
Expatriate footballers in Poland
Expatriate footballers in France
Dutch expatriate sportspeople in Bulgaria
Dutch expatriate sportspeople in Lithuania
Dutch expatriate sportspeople in Poland
Dutch expatriate sportspeople in France